Somer Sivrioğlu is a Turkish chef and restaurateur.

Somer Sivrioğlu was born on 25 May 1971 in Istanbul, where he lived for 25 years. His mother was also a chef and restaurateur, and he gained an understanding of the Turkish cuisine early in life.

Sivrioğlu has held a number of senior positions in the hospitality industry. He has been involved in launching high street restaurant chains, launching specialty eateries and launching and running national restaurants. In 2007, he opened his own restaurant, Efendy, in Balmain, Sydney but it closed in 2021. In 2016, Sivrioglu opened a new Sydney restaurant, Anason, in Barangaroo, Sydney.

He owns and operates Maydanoz restaurant in Sydney and Efendy restaurant in Istanbul.

Somer Sivrioğlu has written weekly columns for the Turkish community newspaper Yeni Vatan. He has also hosted the TV show Somer'in Mutfağı ("Somer's Kitchen") and the SBS Radio program Lezzete Yolculuk (Journey to Taste).

He has been a co-host of https://en.wikipedia.org/wiki/MasterChef_Turkey since 2016.

Awards 
 2013: Local Business Awards WINNER Best Restaurant Inner West 
 2012: Best in Taste Award WINNER 
 2011: RCNSW Awards of Excellence WINNER Specialty Restaurant 
 2010: RCNSW Awards of Excellence WINNER Turkish Restaurant 
 2010: Inner West Courier WINNER Best Restaurant in Inner West

References

Australian chefs
Turkish chefs
Living people
Turkish emigrants to Australia
1971 births